O33 may refer to:
 Otoyol 33, a motorway in Turkey
 Samoa Field Airport, in Humboldt County, California, United States
 Thomas-Morse O-33, an observation aircraft of the United States Army Air Corps